Alice Robitaille (February 3, 1923 – May 28, 2011), from Quebec City, "petite Alys" (little Alys), was a Canadian singer mainly remembered for her later French interpretations of Latin American songs, who performed under the stage name Alys Robi.

Youth
Born in 1923 in the Quebec City neighbourhood of Saint-Sauveur, Robitaille displayed talent for singing and acting at a very young age. She first performed on-stage at the Capitol Theatre at 7. At the time, she had already sung on-air with the CHRC radio station and was a real phenomenon in the whole city.

Career

At 13 she moved to the Théâtre National, on Montreal's Saint Catherine Street. Under the direction of Rose Ouellette, she learned acting and singing during a 75-week engagement. She continued her career in the Montreal cabarets, making radio appearances. For a time during the war, she also hosted a French radio show named Tambour battant ("Rumbling drum"). Touring Canadian military bases propelled her career across Canada.

During the 1940s, she started producing 78s and she became renowned far beyond Canada. She captured popular imagination with Latin titles like Besame Mucho and Tico tico, after translating herself the Spanish or Brazilian songs into French. She sang in chic New York City cabarets by the mid forties and in 1947, she travelled to England where she made an appearance on the first regular BBC television programme.

Mental health
In 1948, while traveling by car to Hollywood, she was injured in an accident, and entered a period of depression. After a series of unfortunate diagnoses, and a failed romance, she suffered a mental breakdown and was interned for several years in a Quebec City asylum. She was at some point subjected to a lobotomy against her will. She credited the operation with her recovery:

"Je me réveillai guérie et j'ai compris plus tard que j'avais été un des rares cas réussis de lobotomie" (I woke up better and later understood that I was one of the rare lobotomy success stories). In 1952, she was released. The same year, she came back on stage at the Casa Loma and the Montmartre, but her efforts were impeded by taboos about mental problems and she never regained the same level of popularity.

Later years
In the early 1990s, Alys returned into the public eye after the massive success she had with a song written for her by Alain Morisod ("Laissez-moi encore chanter"). Books, theses, plays and television series were written about her. A movie was released in December 2004: Alys Robi: Ma vie en cinémascope ("Alys Robi: My Life in Cinemascope"), titled Bittersweet Memories in English.

Robitaille has published two autobiographies: Ma carrière, ma vie ("My Career, My Life", 1980) and Un long cri dans la nuit: Cinq Années à l'Asile ("A Long Cry in the Night: Five Years in the Asylum", 1990). The last autobiography title comes from the song Un long cri dans la nuit, written and composed for Lady Alys by the songwriter Christine Charbonneau in 1989.

Several of Robi's songs have been used for commercial ads. Sico, notably, played on the similarity between its brand name and the title of "Tico Tico" to produce a very catchy campaign based on a spoof of the song.

Robitaille died in the Hôpital Maisonneuve-Rosemont, Montreal, at the age of 88, on May 28, 2011.

Discography 
 Diva (2005) (recorded in 1946 at the CBC)
 Laissez-moi encore chanter (1989)

Compilations
 Alys Robi, Collection QIM (2005)
 Alys Robi, l'anthologie (2004)
 La Collection – volume 1 & 2 (1995)
 La Collection – volume 1 (1995)
 Les Succès d'Alys Robi (1962, 1995)

References

Further reading
 Beaunoyer, Jean. Fleur d'Alys. Montréal: Leméac, cop. 1994. 254, [4] p., ill. (ports.). 
 Sévigny, Jean-Pierre. Sierra Norteña: the Influence of Latin Music on the French-Canadian Popular Song and Dance Scene, Especially as Reflected in the Career of Alys Robi and the Pedagogy of Maurice Lacasse-Morenoff. Montréal: Productions Juke-Box, 1994. 13 p. N.B. Published text of a paper prepared for, and presented, on 12 March 1994, the conference, Popular Music Music & Identity (Montréal, Qué., 12–13 March 1994), under the auspices of the Canadian Branch of the International Association for the Study of Popular Music.

1923 births
2011 deaths
Canadian autobiographers
Canadian women jazz singers
French-language singers of Canada
French Quebecers
Musicians from Quebec City
Lobotomised people
RCA Victor artists
Spanish-language singers of Canada
Women autobiographers
20th-century Canadian women singers
Canadian expatriates in the United States
Canadian expatriates in the United Kingdom